Gabriela Mărginean (born 12 February 1987 in Cluj-Napoca) is a Romanian professional women's basketball player who plays for the Turkey club İzmit Belediyespor.

College career
Mărginean was a two-sport athlete at Drexel University and led the NCAA in made free throws in her sophomore season. Her 2,581 career points while at Drexel makes her Philadelphia's highest scoring women's basketball player. This point total also med her the highest scoring athlete in the history of the CAA until 2013, when she was surpassed by Elena Delle Donne.

While playing for the Drexel Dragons women's basketball team Mărginean played in 125 games and averaged 20.6 points and 7.6 rebounds per game. Marginean led Drexel to its first-ever NCAA Tournament appearance in 2009.

Statistic

Awards and honors

2010 All-CAA First Team
2009 PSWA Outstanding Amateur Athlete
2009 CAA Player of the Year
2009 All-CAA First Team
2009 Dean Ehlers Leadership Award
2009 CAA Tournament MVP
2009 University of Colorado Coors Classic All-Tournament Team
2009 CAA Preseason Player of the Year
2008 All-CAA First Team
2007 All-CAA Third Team
2007 CAA Rookie of the Year

Professional career

WNBA
Mărginean was drafted to the Minnesota Lynx, the 26th pick of the 2010 WNBA Draft. In May the Lynx activated Rebekkah Brunson and Mărginean was waived from the roster. She is the second Romanian who has played in the WNBA after Florina Pașcalău who was the player of Seattle Storm in 2008.

Europe
Later she played for Panathinaikos Athens. Her stats read 17.3 points, 7.6 boards, 2.2 steals and 1.5 assists per game. Eurobasket.com named her All-Greek League Bosman Player of the Year.

Gabriela Mărginean joined Arras Pays d'Artois in the summer of 2010. She appeared 26 times in Ligue Féminine de Basketball averaging 12.3 points and 3.6 rebounds. She managed to win in the 2012 French Cup handing a 58–64 loss to Bourges to take the trophy. Mărginean was one of the best Arras players in the final. She scored 11 points and pulled down 6 rebounds for 35 minutes on the court. Thanks to this victory Arras also booked a spot for the EuroLeague Women 2012–13 season. In EuroCup, Marginean added 16.9 ppg and 4.8 rpg for 10 games.

On July 7, 2012, it was reported that the Romanian champions CSM Târgovişte have signed Gabriela Mărginean.

WNBA career statistics

Regular season

|-
| align="left" | 2010
| align="left" | Minnesota
| 4 || 0 || 3.0 || .200 || .000 || .000 || 1.0 || 0.3 || 0.3 || 0.3 || 0.3 || 0.5

International career
Mărginean is currently the best player on Romania women's national basketball team as she averaged 19.6 points per game in eight games in EuroBasket Women 2013 qualifiers.

Notes

External links
 Drexel Dragons Roster #44 Gabriela Marginean
 Profile at Eurobasket.com
Profile at Fiba Europe

1987 births
Living people
3x3 basketball players at the 2020 Summer Olympics
Basketball players at the 2015 European Games
Club Sportiv Municipal Târgoviște players
Drexel Dragons women's basketball players
European Games competitors for Romania
Minnesota Lynx draft picks
Minnesota Lynx players
Olympic 3x3 basketball players of Romania
Panathinaikos WBC players
Power forwards (basketball)
Romanian expatriate basketball people in France
Romanian expatriate basketball people in Greece
Romanian expatriate basketball people in Spain
Romanian expatriate basketball people in Turkey
Romanian expatriate basketball people in the United States
Romanian women's basketball players
Romanian women's 3x3 basketball players
Small forwards
Sportspeople from Cluj-Napoca